In abstract algebra, a completion is any of several related functors on rings and modules that result in complete topological rings and modules. Completion is similar  to localization, and together they are among the most basic tools in analysing commutative rings. Complete commutative rings have a simpler structure than general ones, and Hensel's lemma applies to them. In algebraic geometry, a completion of a ring of functions R on a space X concentrates on a formal neighborhood of a point of X: heuristically, this is a neighborhood so small that all Taylor series centered at the point are convergent. An algebraic completion is constructed in a manner analogous to completion of a metric space with Cauchy sequences, and agrees with it in the case when R has a metric given by a non-Archimedean absolute value.

General construction 

Suppose that E is an abelian group with a descending filtration

 

of subgroups. One then defines the completion (with respect to the filtration) as the inverse limit:

 

This is again an abelian group. Usually E is an additive abelian group. If E has additional algebraic structure compatible with the filtration, for instance E is a filtered ring, a filtered module, or a filtered vector space, then its completion is again an object with the same structure that is complete in the topology determined by the filtration. This construction may be applied both to commutative and noncommutative rings. As may be expected, when the intersection of the  equals zero, this produces a complete topological ring.

Krull topology 

In commutative algebra, the filtration on a commutative ring R by the powers of a proper ideal I determines the Krull (after Wolfgang Krull) or I-adic topology on R. The case of a maximal ideal  is especially important, for example the distinguished maximal ideal of a valuation ring. The basis of open neighbourhoods of 0 in R is given by the powers In, which are nested and form a descending filtration on R:

(Open neighborhoods of any r ∈ R are given by cosets r + In.) The completion is the inverse limit of the factor rings,

 

pronounced "R I hat". The kernel of the canonical map  from the ring to its completion is the intersection of the powers of I. Thus  is injective if and only if this intersection reduces to the zero element of the ring; by the Krull intersection theorem, this is the case for any commutative Noetherian ring which is an integral domain or a local ring.

There is a related topology on R-modules, also called Krull or I-adic topology. A basis of open neighborhoods of a module M is given by the sets of the form

The completion of an R-module M is the inverse limit of the quotients

 

Examples 

 The ring of p-adic integers  is obtained by completing the ring  of integers at the ideal (p).

 Let R = K[x1,...,xn] be the polynomial ring in n variables over a field K and  be the maximal ideal generated by the variables. Then the completion  is the ring K[[x1,...,xn]] of formal power series in n variables over K.

The kernel is the ideal 

Completions can also be used to analyze the local structure of singularities of a scheme. Notice that in the second case, any Zariski neighborhood of the origin is still an irreducible curve. If we use completions, then we are looking at a "small enough" neighborhood where the node has two components.

Since both rings are given by the intersection of two ideals generated by a homogeneous degree 1 polynomial, we can see algebraically that the singularities "look" the same. This is because such a scheme is the union of two non-equal linear subspaces of the affine plane.

Properties 
 The completion of a Noetherian ring with respect to some ideal is a Noetherian ring.
 The completion of a Noetherian local ring with respect to the unique maximal ideal is a Noetherian local ring.
 The completion is a functorial operation: a continuous map f: R → S of topological rings gives rise to a map of their completions, 
 Moreover, if M and N are two modules over the same topological ring R and f: M → N is a continuous module map then f uniquely extends to the map of the completions:
 
 where  are modules over 
 The completion of a Noetherian ring R is a flat module over R.
 The completion of a finitely generated module M over a Noetherian ring R can be obtained by extension of scalars:

Together with the previous property, this implies that the functor of completion on finitely generated R-modules is exact: it preserves short exact sequences. In particular, taking quotients of rings commutes with completion, meaning that for any quotient R-algebra , there is an isomorphism

 Cohen structure theorem (equicharacteristic case). Let R be a complete local Noetherian commutative ring with maximal ideal  and residue field K. If R contains a field, then
 
 for some n and some ideal I (Eisenbud, Theorem 7.7).

See also 
Formal scheme
Profinite integer
Locally compact field
Zariski ring
Linear topology
Quasi-unmixed ring

Citations

References 

 
 David Eisenbud, Commutative algebra. With a view toward algebraic geometry. Graduate Texts in Mathematics, 150. Springer-Verlag, New York, 1995. xvi+785 pp. ;  
 Fujiwara, K.; Gabber, O.; Kato, F.: “On Hausdorff completions of commutative rings in rigid geometry.” Journal of Algebra, 322 (2011), 293–321.

Commutative algebra
Topological algebra